Qobuz is a French commercial music streaming and downloading service. It was founded in 2007 by Yves Riesel, expanded to a limited range of overseas markets, including the United Kingdom, the Netherlands, Germany, Italy and Spain, and launched  in the US in May 2019.

History 
In 2013, Qobuz received the Hi-Res Audio certification, awarded by the Japan Audio Society (JAS). This certification guarantees that the audio streams delivered by Qobuz meet the criteria and standards defined by the JAS.

At the end of 2015, after a period of financial uncertainty, Qobuz attracted a new investor, which allowed the service to continue operating.

In April 2020, during the early months of the COVID-19 crisis, Qobuz supported artists by giving 100% of the revenue from each new subscriber’s first paid month back to the rights holders.

On June 3, 2020, Qobuz announced the signing of a financial and industrial partnership with Quebecor, a Canadian leader in telecommunications, entertainment, news media and culture. QUB Music, a streaming platform launched in Quebec by the Quebecor company, was born out of this alliance.

On June 15, 2020, Qobuz ended its MP3 quality streaming offer, focusing instead exclusively on lossless streaming. All Qobuz subscriptions give access to high-resolution quality (Hi-Res) and CD quality. However, MP3 listening is available as an option for conserving storage space or using less bandwidth.

In June 2020, the subscription offerings were increased with a family plan, Qobuz Family, which allows the customer to share six accounts among members of the same household.

 Qobuz currently offers four plans: Studio Premier (Base subscription, monthly as well as annual with discount), and Studio Sublime (An annual-only subscription that adds a discount on downloads,) as well as Family variants, with up to six users, of each plan and Duo plan.

Qobuz is available in 25 countries.

Qobuz offers all music in MP3 at 320 kbit/s, CD-DA quality lossless (16-bit/44.1 kHz) as well as hi-resolution quality lossless (up to 24-bit/192 kHz) for certain music; downloads are offered in either WAV, AIFF, ALAC, and FLAC for hi-res quality, with lossless WMA also available for CD quality music only, and MP3, standard WMA, and AAC in 128 kbit/s or 320 kbit/s for lossy quality. 

The streaming service can be accessed via a web player, or by using a desktop player for Windows and macOS; the Windows version may also work on Linux with recent versions of Wine. Qobuz also provides Android and iOS applications. Qobuz is also provided natively on a range of high-fidelity equipment from brands such as Cambridge Audio, Linn and Naim, as well as Roon, and Sonos.

The company has a partnership with the British classical music magazine Gramophone, under which the magazine uses Qobuz to publish recommended playlists.

Locations 
Open in France since 2007, Qobuz extended its reach in 2014 to eight European countries: United Kingdom, Ireland, Germany, Austria, Belgium, Switzerland, Luxembourg and the Netherlands then, in 2017, in Spain and Italy.

In 2018, Qobuz was active in eleven countries. In 2019, Qobuz opened its subsidiary in the United States.

On April 15, 2021, Qobuz made its streaming and downloading offers available in six new countries: Sweden, Denmark, Norway, Finland, Australia and New Zealand.

On May 4th, 2022, Qobuz, continues its global expansion with the opening of its service in six new countries: Brazil, Mexico, Argentina, Colombia, Chile and, in Europe, Portugal.

Application 
The Qobuz application can be downloaded for free on the AppStore, Google Play. Accessible on mobile and tablet, it is also available on computer for Mac, PC and web player. The application allows listening to 30-second clips for free, however, a paid subscription is required to listen to full tracks. Users of iOS and Android smartphones can access the platform after signing up for a Qobuz Studio subscription. The Qobuz app is compatible with Google Cast/Chromecast built-in.

Hardware 
Qobuz streams lossless FLAC files, up to 24-bit/192 kHz, provided by labels, distributors/aggregators, and rights holders.

Since January 22, 2019, Qobuz has been available for listening on Roon.

On January 15, 2020, Naim Audio started integrating Qobuz into its hardware, such as the Uniti Atom, Star & Nova systems as well as the ND5 XS2, NDX 2 and ND 555 network players.

In June 2020, a new update was made for the Mu-so 2nd Generation and Mu-so Qb 2nd Generation wireless systems.

On March 24, 2021, Qobuz became the first music platform to offer high-resolution 24-bit audio streaming on Sonos.

Investment 
In August 2019, the French platform raised €12 million from Nabuboto and the Quebecor Group. Qobuz recorded a +45.3% growth in its last fiscal year 2019-2020. In September 2020, the two historical shareholders, Nabuboto and Quebecor, renewed their confidence in the company by raising a further 10 million euros.

Catalog 
In 2022, Qobuz offers more than 80 million tracks in CD and "Hi-Res" quality (24 bits up to 192 kHz). All the tracks purchased are offered without any DRM restrictions.

See also

Comparison of music streaming services
Comparison of online music stores
List of Internet radio stations

Notes

External links
 

Online music stores of France
Music streaming services
2007 establishments in France